Sherwood is a British television crime drama serial, created and written by James Graham. It stars David Morrissey and is inspired by real life murders in Nottinghamshire, England in 2004. The six episode first series began airing on BBC One on 13 June 2022. It has been renewed for a second series.

Plot
Set in a Nottinghamshire mining village, two shocking killings shatter an already fractured community with a dark past. Divisions from the miners' strike (1984–85) have persisted. The story is loosely based on the murder of trade unionist Keith Frogson in 2004, and begins with the murder of a former union activist, Gary Jackson (Alun Armstrong). Jackson's interest in former police covert activities within the community leads the police to suspect a connection with the miners' strike.

Cast
Alun Armstrong as Gary Jackson
David Morrissey as DCS Ian St Clair
 George Howard as young Ian
Lesley Manville as Julie Jackson
 Poppy Gilbert as young Julie Jackson
Robert Glenister as DI Kevin Salisbury
 Tom Glenister as young Kevin
Kevin Doyle as Fred Rowley
Claire Rushbrook as Cathy Rowley
Lorraine Ashbourne as Daphne Sparrow
Terence Maynard as DS Cleaver
Perry Fitzpatrick as Rory Sparrow
Andrea Lowe as DI Taylor
Philip Jackson as Mickey Sparrow
Clare Holman as Helen St Clair
Adam Hugill as Scott Rowley
Pip Torrens as Commissioner Charles Dawes
Adeel Akhtar as Andy Fisher
Bally Gill as Neel Fisher
Joanne Froggatt as Sarah Vincent
 Nadine Marshall as Jenny Harris
 Don Gilet as Jacob Harris
 Sunetra Sarker as Sheriff of Nottingham
 Ace Bhatti as Vinay Chakarbati
 Lindsay Duncan as Jennifer Hale
 Jonathan Harden as Reverend Wells
 Christopher Fairbank as Bill Raggett
 Stephen Tompkinson as Warnock
 Mark Addy as Ron St. Clair
 Mark Frost as Martín St. Clair
 Callum Hymers as young Martin
 Chanel Cresswell as Rosie Jackson
 Neil Ashton as Carl

Episodes

Reception
The series received critical acclaim. On review aggregator Rotten Tomatoes, it holds an approval rating of 100% based on 16 reviews, with an average score of 8.9/10. The website's critical consensus reads "A gripping mystery that draws immense power from its sterling cast and the specificity of its location, Sherwood is such a rich series that it makes the competition look all the poorer."

The Telegraph gave it five stars and declared it "the best BBC drama of the year so far". Lucy Mangan of The Guardian also gave the finale five out of five stars, remarking that the series "didn’t falter in its intricate plotting, attention to detail or its perfect evocation of place". Nick Hilton of The Independent gave it four stars, calling Graham's writing "sympathetic, vibrant storytelling".

The first episode was watched 4,855,000 times on iPlayer alone during 2022, making it the 9th most viewed individual programme on the platform that year.

References

External links
 

2022 British television series debuts
2020s British crime drama television series
BBC crime drama television shows
British detective television series
English-language television shows
Television shows set in Nottinghamshire
Television series set in 2004
Murder in television